CBYG-FM is a Canadian radio station, which broadcasts the programming of the CBC Radio One network in Prince George, British Columbia. The station airs at 91.5 FM, with an Effective Radiated Power of 100,000 watts and an antenna Height Above Average Terrain of 331.5 meters.

History
The station was launched in 1987 as a rebroadcaster of CBU Vancouver. Prior to its launch, CBC Radio programming aired on private affiliate CKPG. Local programming was introduced in 1988 when CBYG was issued a separate licence.

Local programming
CBYG and CFPR Prince Rupert jointly produce the local morning program Daybreak North. Carolina de Ryk conducts interviews and introduces segments from the studio in Prince Rupert while Bill Fee presents news, roads and weather from the studio in Prince George. Both stations air CBTK-FM's Radio West in the afternoons.

Rebroadcasters

On August 24, 2015, the CBC submitted an application to convert CBXU 940 to 103.1 MHz. The CRTC approved the CBC's application on November 16, 2015.

References

External links

CBC British Columbia
 
Decision CRTC 88-486

BYG
BYG
Radio stations established in 1987
1987 establishments in British Columbia